Nevin may refer to:

Surname
 Nevin (surname)

Given name
Popular Turkish feminine name (from "nev" in Persian, meaning "new").
Nevin Çokay (1930–2012), Turkish painter
Nevin Yanıt (born 1986), Turkish sprinter

Nevin is a common surname of Irish/Scottish origins, but is also used as a given name in the Anglosphere.
Nevin Saroya (born 1980), English footballer
Nevin S. Scrimshaw (1918–2013), American food scientist
Nevin Spence (1990–2012), Irish rugby player
Nevin Harrison (born 2002), American sprint canoeist

Places
Anglicised name for Nefyn, Welsh town
Nevin, Los Angeles

See also
Nevins (disambiguation)
Nevinson

Turkish feminine given names